Boneh-ye Ahmad (also Romanized as Boneh-ye Aḩmad and Boneh Aḩmad) is a village in Liravi-ye Shomali Rural District, in the Central District of Deylam County, Bushehr Province, Iran. At the 2006 census, its population was 45, in 10 families.

References 

Populated places in Deylam County